CB7 may refer to:
 CB postcode area, in England
 Queens Community Board 7, a local governmental advisory board in New York City
 .cb7, a file extension for 7z-compressed comic book archive files
 CB7, a 2020 album by German rapper Capital Bra